December 29 - Eastern Orthodox liturgical calendar - December 31

All fixed commemorations below are observed on January 12 by Orthodox Churches on the Old Calendar.

For December 30th, Orthodox Churches on the Old Calendar commemorate the Saints listed on December 17.

Feasts
 Afterfeast of the Nativity of Christ.

Saints
 Apostle Timon the Deacon, of the Seventy (1st century)
 Virgin-martyr Anysia of Thessaloniki (298)
 Martyr Philoterus (Philetairus) of Nicomedia, and with him six soldiers and one count (311)
 Hieromartyr Zoticus the Priest, of Constantinople, Guardian of Orphans (c. 340) (see also December 31 - Greek)
 Saint Anysios of Thessaloniki, Bishop of Thessaloniki (384-407) (see also December 31 - Slavic)
 Martyrs Magistrianus, Paulinus, Umbrius, Verus, Severus, Callistratus, Florentius, Arianus, Anthimus, Ubricius, Isidore, Euculus, Sampson, Studius, and Thespesius, who suffered under Julian the Apostate (361-363)
 Venerable Theodora of Caesarea in Cappadocia (755)
 Venerable Theodora of Constantinople, Nun (940)
 Venerable Leo (Leonidus) the Archimandrite.

Pre-Schism Western saints
 Saint Liberius of Ravenna, Bishop of Ravenna in Italy, venerated as one of the founders of that diocese (c. 200)
 Martyrs Sabinus of Spoleto, Exuperantius, Marcellus, Venustian and Companions (303)
 Saint Egwin of Evesham, Bishop of Worcester (717)
 Saint Eugene of Milan, Bishop and Confessor.
 Saint Sebastian, a monk who became Archbishop of Esztergom (1002) and Primate of Hungary in the time of St Stephen (1036)

Post-Schism Orthodox saints
 Saint Tryphon, Bishop of Rostov (1468)
 Saint Macarius, Metropolitan of Moscow and All Russia (1563)
 Venerable Monk-martyr Gideon of Karakalou monastery of Mt. Athos, at Turnovo (1818)

New martyrs and confessors
 New Hieromartyr Priest Sergius Florinsky of Rakvere, Estonia (1918)
 Virgin-martyr Mary Danilova, New-Martyr of Yaroslavl-Rostov (1946)

Other commemorations
 Uncovering of the relics (1652) of St. Daniel, Abbot of Pereyaslavl-Zalesski (1540)

Icon gallery

Notes

References

Sources
 December 30/January 12. Orthodox Calendar (PRAVOSLAVIE.RU).
 January 12 / December 30. HOLY TRINITY RUSSIAN ORTHODOX CHURCH (A parish of the Patriarchate of Moscow).
 December 30. OCA - The Lives of the Saints.
 The Autonomous Orthodox Metropolia of Western Europe and the Americas (ROCOR). St. Hilarion Calendar of Saints for the year of our Lord 2004. St. Hilarion Press (Austin, TX). pp. 3–4.
 December 30. Latin Saints of the Orthodox Patriarchate of Rome.
 The Roman Martyrology. Transl. by the Archbishop of Baltimore. Last Edition, According to the Copy Printed at Rome in 1914. Revised Edition, with the Imprimatur of His Eminence Cardinal Gibbons. Baltimore: John Murphy Company, 1916. pp. 401–402.
Greek Sources
 Great Synaxaristes:  30 ΔΕΚΕΜΒΡΙΟΥ. ΜΕΓΑΣ ΣΥΝΑΞΑΡΙΣΤΗΣ.
  Συναξαριστής. 30 Δεκεμβρίου. ECCLESIA.GR. (H ΕΚΚΛΗΣΙΑ ΤΗΣ ΕΛΛΑΔΟΣ). 
Russian Sources
  12 января (30 декабря). Православная Энциклопедия под редакцией Патриарха Московского и всея Руси Кирилла (электронная версия). (Orthodox Encyclopedia - Pravenc.ru).
  30 декабря (ст.ст.) 12 января 2013 (нов. ст.). Русская Православная Церковь Отдел внешних церковных связей. (DECR).

December in the Eastern Orthodox calendar